Schlossbrücke is a bridge in the central Mitte district of Berlin, Germany. Built between 1821 and 1824 according to plans designed by Karl Friedrich Schinkel, it was named after the nearby City Palace (Stadtschloss). The bridge marks the eastern end of the Unter den Linden boulevard.

History
A bridge at the site, leading across the Spree canal, already existed in the 15th century, when Berlin emerged as the residence of the Brandenburg margraves. The Hohenzollern rulers passed it, when they left their Stadtschloss residence for hunting in the Tiergarten grounds. Then called Hundebrücke, after the accompanying packs of dogs, the pile bridge was rebuilt in 1738 and later served Napoleon's troops as a direct route into the city centre.

In the early 19th century, the wooden bridge was considered inadequate by King Frederick William III of Prussia, who ordered a new prestigious construction and commissioned his court architect Karl Friedrich Schinkel. First studies and drafts date from 1819; construction started two years later, then part of a general project to refurbish the whole area on Unter den Linden between Spree and present-day Bebelplatz. From the new arch bridge built of sandstone, the broad Unter den Linden boulevard ran in a direct line to the western city limits at Brandenburg Gate. Schinkel also had the adjacent Lustgarten premises in the east restored and designed the nearby Neue Wache to commemorate the veterans of the Napoleonic Wars. On 29 November 1823, during the marriage of Crown Prince Frederick William IV with Princess Elisabeth Ludovika of Bavaria, large crowds thronged across the yet uncompleted construction and 22 people drowned falling into the river. The bridge was opened to the traffic in Summer 1824.

Again enlarged in 1912 and equipped with a reinforced concrete structure in the 1920s, the bridge suffered only minor damage in World War II. In 1951 the East German authorities renamed it Marx-Engels-Brücke, along with the adjacent Marx-Engels-Platz (present-day Schloßplatz). Its original name was restored on 3 October 1991, one year after German reunification.

Statues
Statues erected on the bridge include: 

 Athena Arms the Warrior (1851)
 Athena Leads the Young Warrior into the Fight (1853)
 Athena Protects the Young Hero (1854)
 Athena Teaches the Young Man How to Use a Weapon (1853)
 Iris Takes the Fallen Hero to Olympus (1857)
 Nike Assists the Wounded Warrior (1853)
 Nike Crowns the Hero (1853)
 Nike Instructs the Boy in Heroic History

 Statues on south side of the bridge from west to east
 Nike instructs the boy in heroic history by Emil Wolff, 1847
 Athena Teaches the Young Man How to Use a Weapon by Hermann Schievelbein, 1853
 Athena Arms the Warrior by Karl Heinrich Möller, 1851
 Nike Crowns the Hero by Friedrich Drake, 1853

 Statues on north side from west to east
 Nike Assists the Wounded Warrior by Ludwig Wilhelm Wichmann, 1853
 Athena Leads the Young Warrior into the Fight by Albert Wolff, 1853
 Athena Protects the Young Hero by Gustav Blaeser, 1854
 Iris Takes the Fallen Hero to Olympus by August Wredow, 1857

References

External links

Bridges in Berlin
Heritage sites in Berlin
Karl Friedrich Schinkel buildings